Joel Reynolds (born 5 June 1984) is a former Australian rules footballer. Reynolds is the grandson of Bomber legend Dick Reynolds. At the conclusion of the 2006 season, and after five seasons and just 38 games for the Bombers, Reynolds was delisted and was picked up by Geelong in the pre-season rookie draft. He did not play in 2007 due to a bad knee injury and was eventually delisted at the end of the 2007 season.

He also played in the EDFL 2011 Grand Final with the Strathmore Football CLub where they beat Oak Park to come out victorious.

Statistics
 Statistics are correct to end of 2007 Season

External links

Essendon Football Club players
1984 births
Living people
Australian rules footballers from Victoria (Australia)
Geelong Falcons players
St Joseph's Football Club players